Hildebrandtia may refer to:
Hildebrandtia (frog), a genus of frogs
Hildebrandtia (plant), a genus of bindweeds